William Daum Euler,  (July 10, 1875 – July 15, 1961) was a Canadian parliamentarian.

Euler was born in Conestogo, Ontario, the son of Henry Euler and Catherine Daum. He attended Berlin High School between the years of 1891 and 1893. He then taught in Suddaby Public School and later founded the Euler Business College. Euler married Jean Howd. He was mayor of Berlin, Ontario (now Kitchener) from 1914 to 1917. He was first elected to the House of Commons of Canada in 1917 representing the riding of Waterloo North, Ontario. A Liberal, he held three cabinet positions: Minister of Customs and Excise (1926 to 1927), Minister of National Revenue (1927 to 1930), and Minister of Trade and Commerce (1935 to 1940). He served until 1940, when he was appointed to the Senate representing the senatorial division of Waterloo, Ontario. He died in office in 1961 in Kitchener. He is buried in the Mount Hope Cemetery in Kitchener, Ontario.

As Senator, he waged the campaign to eliminate the ban on margarine in Canada.

In 1961 he became the first Chancellor of Waterloo Lutheran University (now Wilfrid Laurier University).

There is a Willam Daum Euler fonds at Library and Archives Canada.

References
Brown, H. W., B.A. (1927). "The Kitchener and Waterloo Collegiate and Vocational School: Its History". Fifteenth Annual Report of the Waterloo Historical Society 15: 268-284.

External links

 

1875 births
1961 deaths
Laurier Liberals
Canadian senators from Ontario
Canadian university and college chancellors
Liberal Party of Canada MPs
Liberal Party of Canada senators
Mayors of Kitchener, Ontario
Members of the House of Commons of Canada from Ontario
Members of the King's Privy Council for Canada
People from Woolwich, Ontario
Burials at Mount Hope Cemetery, Kitchener, Ontario